Caluquembe (Kalukembe) is a town and municipality, with a population of 179,931 (2014 census), in the province of Huíla, Angola.

It is also the site of two missionary efforts; one, Roman Catholic and the other, Evangelical Protestant. At the Protestant mission there were for the majority of the past century a Bible school and a hospital run by the Swiss Alliance Missionaire Evangelique.

Climate
Caluquembe has a subtropical highland climate (Köppen: Cwb).

References

Didier Péclard, "Ethos missionnaire et esprit du capitalisme. La Mission Philafricaine en Angola, 1897-1907", _ Le Fait Missionnaire _ (Lausanne), no.1, Mai 1995, 97p.

Populated places in Huíla Province
Municipalities of Angola